Tatiana Georgiou (born 4 January 1996) is a Greek footballer who plays as a defender for NK Olimpija Ljubljana and has appeared for the Greece women's national team.

Career
She was born on January 4, 1996.Coming from Karteri, a village in Thesprotia, she grew up in Igoumenitsa where she took her first steps in football. He initially joined the boys' academies of Thesprotos Igoumenitsa, continued his career at Amazones Thesprotia and Thesprotos and in 2014 took the first big step, as he moved to Thessaloniki to wear the shirt of the Greek Champion, PAOK. After five years, in the summer of 2019, she made the second leap in her career and moved to Italy, where she played for Napoli in the Serie A Championship, to be followed in 2021 by Cesena and her participation in the Serie B, in the summer of 2022 moved to Slovenia and Olimpija Ljubljana. She plays as a defender. She is one of the key players of the Women's National team and she has been capped for the Greece national team, appearing for the team during the 2019 FIFA Women's World Cup qualifying cycle.

References

External links
 
 
 

1996 births
Living people
Greek women's footballers
Greek expatriate women's footballers
Greece women's international footballers
Women's association football defenders